Ural State Pedagogical University is a public university located in Yekaterinburg, Russia. It was founded in 1930.

History

"To open the Urals Industrial and Pedagogical Institute in Sverdlovsk for the training of teaching personnel for schools, FZU and FES" (decree of the Council of People's Commissars of the RSFSR No. 33 of August 25, 1930).

In 1932 the institute was given a new name - the Urals Pedagogical Institute (UPI). In November 1932 branches of Rabfak were established at Uralmash and in cities of Ural region: Nizhni Tagil, Chelyabinsk, Sarapul, Nevyansk, Irbit, Alapaevsk, Kushva, Verkhnaya Salda, Aramil and others.

In 1934 the Institute introduced a system of faculties, the following departments were established: History and Economics, Literature, Physics and Mathematics, Pedagogy, Chemistry.

During the World War II 57 teachers and staff members and 186 students of the Institute joined the Workers' and Peasants' Red Army as volunteers. The Institute turned over to the military organizations most of its buildings and hostels. In January 1943 the first students (37 persons) who had been demobilized due to wounds or other reasons started to come back to the institute.

In 1959 the Ministry of Education of the RSFSR has made a decision to open music and pedagogical faculties in pedagogical institutes of a number of Russian cities. In the same year, the musical-pedagogical faculty was opened in the Sverdlovsk State Pedagogical Institute.

In 1978-1979 two new dormitories for 620 and 640 beds were commissioned. By September 1975, the last boiler house was eliminated. Now all the buildings of the institute were connected to the central heating. The institute had four well-appointed dormitories for 2,100 students. In 1993, the institute was given the status of a university. The new name of the institute was the Ural State Pedagogical University. The first Council for the Defense of Ph.D. theses on pedagogical sciences in the history of the institute is opened.

In 2001 two newly opened Ural State Pedagogical University branches - in Chelyabinsk and Novouralsk - got licenses for conducting educational activities in the field of higher professional education.

In 2005 Ural State Pedagogical University celebrates its 75th anniversary. In this jubilee year, the university had 7 institutes and 17 faculties, 69 departments and 4 research centers. More than 15 thousand students were enrolled in full-time and part-time departments.

Currently, the structure of the university includes 9 institutes.

Structure
 Institute of Foreign Languages
 Institute of Mathematics, Physics, Informatics and Technology
 Institute of Music and Art Education
 Institute of Social Sciences
 Institute of Pedagogy and Psychology of Childhood
 Institute of Psychology
 Institute of Special Education
 Institute of Philology and Intercultural Communication
 Institute of Natural Science, Physical Culture and Tourism

Notes and references

External links

 

Universities in Sverdlovsk Oblast
Buildings and structures in Yekaterinburg
Education in Yekaterinburg
Teachers colleges in Russia
1930 establishments in Russia
Educational institutions established in 1930
Universities and institutes established in the Soviet Union
Public universities and colleges in Russia